The Greatest Love, is a 2019 Burmese romantic-drama film starring Nay Toe, Nay Chi Oo, Thu Riya, Tyron Bejay and May Barani Thaw. The film, produced by 7th Sense Film Production premiered in Myanmar on October 17, 2019.

Cast
 Nay Toe as Tat Lu Naing
 Nay Chi Oo as Leik Pyar
 Thu Riya as Di Par
 Tyron Bejay as Tyron
 May Barani Thaw as May Paing
 Soe Myat Thuzar as Angelin

References

2019 films
2010s Burmese-language films
Burmese romantic drama films
Films shot in Myanmar